Young April is a 1926 American silent romantic comedy film directed by Donald Crisp, and starring Bessie Love, Joseph Schildkraut, and Rudolph Schildkraut. The film was produced by Cecil B. DeMille and distributed by Producers Distributing Corporation. The film has survived and has been released on home video.

Plot 
Prince Caryl of Belgravia (Joseph Schildkraut) is to be married to Archduchess Victoria (Love), whom he has never met. He rebels by stealing the royal crown and going to Paris to pawn it and enjoy the money. Victoria, who has been raised an orphan in America, is told of her title and upcoming wedding, and goes to Paris for a final week of freedom and a shopping spree. While in Paris, she buys the royal crown and meets—and falls in love with—Caryl, each not knowing the other's royal identity.

Caryl's unethical brother Prince Michael (Washburn) comes to Paris, and prevents Victoria from revealing her identity to Caryl, who renounces his title to be with her. Michael kidnaps Victoria, but Caryl rescues her via an elaborate change involving carriages, cars, and airplanes.

Cast

Release and reception 
Young April had its New York premiere at the Hippodrome. The film, particularly the production, received positive reviews.

References

External links 

 
 
 
 
 
 Lobby cards
 Stills and review at moviessilently.com

1926 romantic comedy films
1926 films
American black-and-white films
American romantic comedy films
American silent feature films
Films based on British novels
Films directed by Donald Crisp
Films set in Paris
Films set in Europe
Producers Distributing Corporation films
Surviving American silent films
1920s American films
Silent romantic comedy films
Silent American comedy films